Edward Baldwin Whitney (August 16, 1857 – January 5, 1911) was an American lawyer and judge.

Life
Edward Baldwin Whitney was born August 16, 1857. His father was linguist William Dwight Whitney  (1827–1894) of the New England Dwight family. His mother was Elizabeth Wooster Baldwin, daughter of US Senator and Governor of Connecticut Roger Sherman Baldwin.

He graduated from Yale College, 1878, where he was a member of Skull and Bones along with future US President William H. Taft.  After Yale he went on to the Columbia Law School and was admitted to the bar of New York, 1880.

He was managing clerk, Bristow, Peet & Opdyke. In 1883, with General Henry Lawrence Burnett, who was a member of that firm, he formed the firm of Burnett & Whitney.

He was a justice of the First District New York State Supreme Court from 1909–1911.

Aside from his judgeship, he never held elected office. He was an active Democrat and organizer of the national association of Democratic clubs, secretary from its organization, 1888–90. At the May 1892 convention at Syracuse he was chosen as delegate to the National Democratic Convention at Chicago.

Whitney was a trustee, Reform Club; member, Century Club; Democratic Club; Skull and Bones; and of the Lawyers' club and of the bar association of New York. He was appointed by President Grover Cleveland to be Assistant Attorney General of the United States.

He married A. Josepha Newcomb, who was active in the suffrage movement. In 1912, she organized the first Cornwall meeting in support of voting rights for women, the daughter of astronomer and mathematician Simon Newcomb. Her sister, Anita Newcomb McGee, was a doctor who helped establish the Army Nurse Corps.

Their son Hassler Whitney was the famous Princeton University mathematician. Their son William Dwight Whitney was an international attorney who represented actress Adrianne Allen in her divorce from actor Raymond Massey; William Whitney then married Adrianne, and his first wife Dorothy married Raymond. Their son Simon N. Whitney was the chief economist and director of the Bureau of Economics at the Federal Trade Commission, 1956–1961, and also was an economist with the Federal Administration of Export Control.

He died January 5, 1911. He had just been appointed to the New York State Supreme Court, and contracted a cold that turned into pneumonia on his return from being sworn in.

References

External links
William Dwight Whitney/Edward Baldwin Whitney at The Descendants of John Whitney, pages 486 - 490 
Edward Baldwin Whitney at The Descendants of John Whitney, pages 491 - 495
At the United States Government, 1893
 Sherman Genealogy Including Families of Essex, Suffolk and Norfolk, England By Thomas Townsend Sherman
Hoar-Baldwin-Foster-Sherman family of Massachusetts at Political Graveyard
DR. ANITA NEWCOMB MCGEE'S PICTORIAL RECORD OF THE RUSSO-JAPANESE WAR, 1904
Josepha Newcomb Whitney
Dr. Simon N. Whitney; Economist and Author
 Baldwin-Greene-Gager family of Connecticut  at Political Graveyard
 Sherman-Hoar family  at Political Graveyard

1857 births
1911 deaths
New York (state) state court judges
United States Assistant Attorneys General
Columbia Law School alumni
New York (state) Democrats
Yale College alumni
19th-century American judges